Francis Brewster may refer to:
 Francis Brewster (lord mayor) (fl. 1674–1702), alderman and lord mayor of Dublin, Ireland
 Francis Brewster (English MP) (1623–1671), member of parliament for Suffolk, and for Dunwich
 Francis Brewster (Irish MP) (fl. 1693–1713), member of parliament for Midleton, and for Dingle